Phillip Tucker Cunningham (born ) is an American college basketball coach.

Cunningham was the Head Coach of Troy University from 2013 to 2019, compiling 80 wins throughout his six year tenure. During his time with Troy, Cunningham led the school to their first NCAA tournament appearance in 14 years after winning the 2017 Sun Belt Conference tournament championship. Cunningham was named the head coach at Troy after coach Don Maestri retired after serving as head coach at Troy for 31 years.

Born in Paducah, Kentucky and a native of Campbellsville, Kentucky, Cunningham played collegiately at Kentucky Wesleyan College. After two seasons playing for the Panthers, where he won a Division II national championship in 1987, Cunningham decided to transfer to Campbellsville College (now known as Campbellsville University) to play for his father.

Cunningham was recently tabbed by Rivals.com as one of the nation's top 25 assistant coaches. He was also previously recognized by The Hoop Scoop recruiting publication as one of the top NCAA Division I men's basketball assistant coaches.

Head coaching record

References

1966 births
Living people
American men's basketball players
Basketball coaches from Kentucky
Basketball players from Kentucky
Campbellsville Tigers men's basketball players
College men's basketball head coaches in the United States
Georgia State Panthers men's basketball coaches
James Madison Dukes men's basketball coaches
Kentucky Wesleyan Panthers men's basketball players
Mississippi State Bulldogs men's basketball coaches
Troy Trojans men's basketball coaches
Western Kentucky Hilltoppers basketball coaches